Gosaldo is a comune (municipality) in the Province of Belluno in the Italian region Veneto, located about  northwest of Venice and about  northwest of Belluno.

The municipality of Gosaldo contains the frazioni (subdivisions, mainly villages and hamlets) Don, Sarasin, and Tiser.

Gosaldo borders the following municipalities: Cesiomaggiore, Rivamonte Agordino, Sagron Mis, Sedico, Sospirolo, Taibon Agordino, Tonadico, Voltago Agordino.

Demographic evolution

Twin towns
Gosaldo is twinned with:

  Saint-Marcel-Bel-Accueil, France, since 2011

References

External links
 www.agordino.bl.it/gosaldo/

Cities and towns in Veneto